The Plateau Point Trail is a hiking and pack trail located on the South Rim of the Grand Canyon National Park, located in the U.S. state of Arizona.

Description
The trail is accessed by the Bright Angel Trail, at Indian Garden.

The trail begins at Indian Garden,  from the rim on the Bright Angel Trail.

Plateau Point overlooks the Granite Gorge between Pipe Creek Canyon and Monument Canyon.

There is water available at Indian Garden and near the end of the trail when turned on.

See also

 The Grand Canyon
 List of trails in Grand Canyon National Park

References

External links
 Grand Canyon National Park, Official site
 OpenStreetMap
 OpenStreetMap GPX file download
 Plateau Point Hike Guide

Hiking trails in Grand Canyon National Park